The Agamemnon-class (sometimes known as the James Watt-class) steam battleships, or steam ships of the line, were a class of five 91-gun steam second rates of the Royal Navy. The original design was produced by John Edye in 1847, as a response to the French Le Napoléon, which was rumoured to be under development. 

The first ship of the class, Agamemnon, was originally designed as a two decker, 80 gun sailing ship of the line. But was re-ordered as the first purpose built steam screw ship for the British Navy.

Ships

Builder: Woolwich Dockyard
Ordered: 25 August 1849
Launched: August 1852
Fate: Sold, 12 May 1870

Builder: Pembroke Dockyard
Ordered: 14 January 1850
Launched: 23 April 1853
Fate: Sold, 23 January 1875

Builder: Pembroke Dockyard
Ordered: 
Launched: 27 September 1855
Fate: Sold, 1898

Builder: Woolwich Dockyard
Ordered: 
Launched: 23 October 1858
Fate: Sold, 1904

Builder: Chatham Dockyard
Ordered: 
Launched: 15 April 1858
Fate: Sold, 20 June 1871

References & Citations

Lambert, Andrew (1984) Battleships in Transition: The Creation of the Steam Battlefleet 1815–1860. Conway Maritime Press. .

Ship of the line classes